The Picture of Dorian Gray (German: Das Bildnis des Dorian Gray) is a 1917 German silent fantasy film directed by Richard Oswald and starring Bernd Aldor, Ernst Pittschau, and Ernst Ludwig. The film is based on the 1890 novel The Picture of Dorian Gray by Oscar Wilde.

The film's sets were designed by the art director Manfred Noa.

Plot summary

Cast
 Bernd Aldor as Dorian Gray 
 Ernst Pittschau as Sir Henry Wotton 
 Ernst Ludwig as Basil Hallward, painter
 Andreas Van Horn as Alan Campbell, pharmacist
 Lea Lara as Sibyl Vane 
 Sophie Pagay as Dorian's mother 
 Arthur Wellin as James Vane, Sibyl's brother 
 Lupu Pick as Dorian's valet

See also 
 Adaptations of The Picture of Dorian Gray

Bibliography
 Kohl, Norbert. Oscar Wilde: The Works of a Conformist Rebel. Cambridge University Press, 1989.

External links
 
 

1917 films
German fantasy films
Films directed by Richard Oswald
Films set in England
German silent feature films
1910s fantasy films
Films of the German Empire
Films based on The Picture of Dorian Gray
German black-and-white films
Silent horror films
1910s German films